The Sony Xperia XA is an Android smartphone produced by Sony. Part of the Xperia XA Series, the device was unveiled along with the Sony Xperia X and Sony Xperia X Performance at MWC 2016 on February 22, 2016.

Specifications

Hardware

The device features a 5.0-inch 720p screen and a 64-bit 2.0 GHz octa-core Mediatek MT6755 (Helio P10) system-on-chip with 2 GB of RAM. The device also has 16 GB internal storage with microSD card expansion up to 200 GB and includes non-removable 2300 mAh battery.

The rear-facing camera of the Xperia XA is 13 megapixels with sensor size of 1/3 inch, featuring Sony Exmor RS IMX258 image sensor with quick launch and also features hybrid autofocus that utilizes phase detection autofocus that can focus the object within 0.03 seconds.

Software
The Xperia XA is preinstalled with Android 6.0.1 Marshmallow with Sony's custom interface and software. On August 23, 2016, Sony announced that the Xperia XA would receive an upgrade to Android 7.0 Nougat. On June 16, 2017, it was reported that Android 7.0 Nougat was rolling out to the Xperia XA.

Variants 

Here are the complete description of the Xperia XA variants in the world:

Release dates 
The Sony Xperia XA was launched in India on June 27, 2016 with 
The device was launched in USA on July 17, 2016.

See also 
Sony Xperia X
Sony Xperia X Performance
Sony Xperia M4 Aqua
Sony Xperia M5

References

External links 

Official Press Release
Official Whitepaper 
Official Whitepaper (Dual SIM version) 

Android (operating system) devices
Sony smartphones
Mobile phones introduced in 2016
Digital audio players